Katherine Craig (or similar) may refer to:

Catherine Craig (1915–2004), American actress
Kit Craig (1932–2017), pen name (for psychological thrillers) of American author Kit Reed
Kate Craig (1947–2002), Canadian video and performance artist
Cathryn Craig (folk singer), American folk singer who has partnered with guitarist Brian Willoughby
Katherine L. Craig, Colorado's Superintendent of Public Instruction in the early 20th century

Characters
Cathy Craig, character on American daytime drama, One Life to Live

See also
Cathie Craigie (born 1954), Scottish Labour politician
Katherine Creag (born 1973), Filipino-American television journalist
Kate Craig-Wood (born 1977), English IT entrepreneur
Craig (surname)